The Holectypoida are an order of sea urchins related to the sand dollars. The order consists of just two living genera, but was once more diverse.

Description and characteristics
In appearance, the living holectypoids are similar to sand dollars, but with less flattened bodies and an oval outline. They also lack the petal-like patterns found on the bodies of sand dollars.

Taxonomy
According to World Register of Marine Species : 
 family Anorthopygidae Wagner & Durham, 1966b †
 family Coenholectypidae Smith & Wright, 1999 †
 family Discoididae Lambert, 1900
 family Holectypidae Lambert, 1900 †

References
 

Gnathostomata (echinoid)
Extant Early Jurassic first appearances